Ivan Magalhães dos Santos (born 23 December 1993) is a Brazilian professional footballer who plays as a defender for USL League One club Richmond Kickers.

Career

College and amateur
Magalhães played two years of college soccer at Eastern Florida State College between 2013 and 2014, before transferring to the University of Maryland in 2015.

Professional 
Magalhães was drafted in the second round of the 2016 MLS SuperDraft (26th overall) by Houston Dynamo. However, he didn't sign with Houston, instead joining their United Soccer League affiliate Rio Grande Valley FC on March 16, 2016. He recorded over 4,800 minutes in 56 matches for Rio Grande Valley FC, scoring two goals in his first two professional seasons.

On 12 January 2018, it was announced that Magalhães had signed with the Tampa Bay Rowdies.

On 19 March 2019, Magalhães signed with the Richmond Kickers ahead of the inaugural USL League One season.

References

External links
 
 Maryland bio
 UOL ESPORTE - "Ele deixou o Corinthians, foi estudar economia e agora joga nos EUA"
 ESPN - "Único brasileiro no draft da MLS trocou o Corinthians por diploma de economia nos EUA"

1993 births
Living people
Brazilian footballers
Brazilian expatriate footballers
Association football defenders
Expatriate soccer players in the United States
Houston Dynamo FC draft picks
Maryland Terrapins men's soccer players
Richmond Kickers players
Rio Grande Valley FC Toros players
Tampa Bay Rowdies players
USL Championship players
USL League One players
Eastern Florida State College people
Brazilian expatriate sportspeople in the United States
Footballers from São Paulo